Morchard Road is a small hamlet in mid Devon, UK. It has a pub, the Devonshire Dumpling. It also has a railway station on the Tarka Line.

External links 
 The Devonshire Dumpling public house

Hamlets in Devon